Hadiza Bala Usman (born 2 January 1976) is a Nigerian politician who served as the Managing Director of the Nigerian Ports from 2016 to 2021. She was previously the chief of staff to the Governor of Kaduna State from 2015 to 2016.

Since 2014, she is one of the co-founders of the Bring Back Our Girls campaign, and is also a founding member of the ruling All Progressives Congress.

Early life and education 
Hadiza Bala Usman was born on 2 January 1976 in Zaria to a Fulani ruling class family of the Sullubawa clan. Her father, Yusufu Bala Usman, the grandson of Sarkin Katsina Muhammadu Katsina Dikko, was a prominent academic and historian. He later founded the Centre for Democratic Development, Research and Training in Zaria. Her great grandfather, Abdullahi Bayero (father to her paternal grandmother), was the 10th Emir of Kano from 1926 to 1953, her paternal grand father was the Durbin Katsina, her grand uncle was Usman Nagogo the Emir of Katsina and her great grand father was Sarkin Katsina Muhammadu Dikko (father to her paternal grandfather).

Hadiza grew up on the campus of Ahmadu Bello University in Zaria, where her father worked. She started her education at the university staff primary school and went ahead to complete her secondary education. In 1996, she enrolled at the university and received a bachelor's degree in business administration in 2000. She later received a master's degree in development studies from the University of Leeds in 2009.

Career 
In 1999, she spent a year at the Centre for Democratic Development and Research Training in Zaria as a research assistant.

She then worked at the Bureau of Public Enterprises from July 2000 to August 2004 as an enterprise officer. From October 2004 to January 2008, she was then hired by the UNDP for the Federal Capital Territory Administration as a special assistant to the Minister on project implementation.

In 2011, Hadiza campaigned and lost for the federal constituency of Musawa/Matazu as a candidate of the Congress for Progressive Change. She then joined the Good Governance Group in Nigeria, a non-governmental organisation, as the country director of strategy from 2011 to July 2015.

In 2014, following the Chibok schoolgirls kidnapping by Boko Haram, Hadiza Bala Usman noticed that the Jonathan administration was not prioritizing the kidnapping, she then co-founded the Bring Back Our Girls campaign group to advocate the rescue of the abducted schoolgirls. She chose the colour red for the campaign because it is a sign of "alarm, danger, a warning." Hadiza Bala Usman has also helped coordinate meetings with the parents of the kidnapped girls and members of the Nigerian government. She has continued to protest with the group into 2016.

In 2015, following his election Governor Nasir Ahmad el-Rufai appointed her as Chief of Staff to the Governor of Kaduna State. She was appointed as the Managing Director of Nigerian Ports Authority (NPA) in July 2016 by President Muhammadu Buhari. Her appointment generated a lot of controversies as many saw her nomination as ethnically based and questioned her qualification for the specific role.

In May 6, 2021, President Muhammadu Buhari approved her suspension as the Managing Director of Nigerian Ports Authority (NPA). Hadiza, who was recently re-appointed for second term, was suspended by President Buhari over the manner she was appointed for the second term.

Personal life 
Hadiza Bala Usman was married to an economic analyst Tanimu Yakubu Kurfi who served under the former (Late) President Umaru Musa Yar'adua as economic adviser and together they have two boys.

Recognition 
She has been recognized in various ways for her achievements both in the maritime sector as Queen of the Maritime and Nigeria's public service among Under 50 Leaders in Public Service in 2021 when she received the outstanding female executive in public service (Maritime) award alongside other prominent women in public service.

References

External links 
 Interview  on Women's Media Center Live
 Hadiza Bala Usman Biography

Nigerian human rights activists
Nigerian politicians
1976 births
People from Zaria
Living people